Hemmatabad (also Romanized as Hemmatābād and Himmatābād) is a village in Bala Velayat Rural District, Bala Velayat District, Bakharz County, Razavi Khorasan Province, Iran. At the 2006 census, its population was 1,616, in 368 families.

References 

Populated places in Bakharz County